Radical History Review is a scholarly journal published by Duke University Press.

The journal describes its position as "at the point where rigorous historical scholarship and active political engagement converge". In 1979, the journal advertised that it "publishes the best marxist and non-marxist radical scholarship in jargon-free English". 

With the 1990s academic shift towards postmodernism, the journal dropped its militant stance to emphasize instead culturalist "issues of gender, race, sexuality, imperialism, and class, stretching the boundaries of historical analysis to explore Western and non-Western histories". In 1999, the editors described "the journal's recent move toward a more overtly political discussion of historical topics".

Reception 
The New Criterion describes RHR as "a publication that plainly states it 'rejects conventional notions of scholarly neutrality and 'objectivity,' and approaches history from an engaged, critical, political stance.'"

Jon Wiener in the 1991 book Professors, Politics, and Pop wrote, "The journal has recently distinguished itself by publishing a series of interviews with (several historians) exploring the relationship in their work between historical scholarship and political commitment."

References

History journals
Duke University Press academic journals